Alex George (born March 1949) is a Scottish former professional motorcycle road racer. He competed in the Grand Prix world championships in 1970 and then from 1973 to 1979. George was a street circuit specialist and was a three-time winner at the Isle of Man TT. His best year in world championship competition came in 1975 when he finished in seventh place in the 500 cc Grand Prix world championship.

Born in Glasgow, George finished tenth in the 500 class in 1973. During the 1975 500cc world championship, he scored podium results with a third place behind Phil Read and Giacomo Agostini at the 500cc Czechoslovak Grand Prix and a third place behind Dieter Braun and Pentti Korhonen at the 350 cc Dutch TT. His third place in the 1977 500 cc Austrian Grand Prix came about as a result of some riders boycotting the race, following an accident in the earlier 350 cc race. Riders in the 500 cc category then organised a boycott of their race which led to only 14 competitors taking part. He teamed up with Jean-Claude Chemarin on the Honda France team to win the 1976 Bol d'Or 24-hour endurance race. He also competed in the Formula 750 Class on a Yamaha TZ750.

His most memorable victory at the Isle of Man TT came in 1979, when he beat pre-race favourite Mike Hailwood who had successfully returned to motorcycle racing at the 1978 Isle of Man TT  after a short time in Formula 1 Grand Prix car racing. Serious injuries sustained while competing in the 1982 Isle of Man TT ended his competitive career.

George was President of the TT Riders Association during 2017.

References 

1949 births
Living people
Sportspeople from Glasgow
Scottish motorcycle racers
250cc World Championship riders
350cc World Championship riders
500cc World Championship riders
Isle of Man TT riders